The 2007 Guadiana Trophy competition took place between 3-5 August 2007 and featured Benfica, Sporting Clube de Portugal, and Real Betis. Benfica won in the final against rivals Sporting.

Matches

Day 1

Day 2

Day 3

2007–08
2007–08 in Spanish football
2007–08 in Portuguese football